Cookin' on all Burners is an album by American jazz guitarist Tal Farlow, released in 1983. The album featured a rhythm section including former Jazz Messenger pianist James Williams, and drummer Vinnie Johnson, who had played in the 1970s with T-Bone Walker and would later join Lester Bowie's Brass Fantasy.

Track listing 
 "You'd Be So Nice to Come Home To" (Cole Porter) – 3:29  
 "If I Should Lose You" (Ralph Rainger, Leo Robin) – 5:00  
 "I Wished on the Moon" (Rainger, Dorothy Parker) – 5:23  
 "I've Got the World on a String" (Harold Arlen, Ted Koehler) – 6:23  
 "Love Letters" (Victor Young, Edward Heyman) – 3:58  
 "Why Shouldn't I?" (Porter) – 3:09  
 "Lullaby of the Leaves" (Bernice Petkere, Joe Young) – 5:40  
 "Just Friends" (John Klenner, Sam M. Lewis) – 3:49  
 "I Thought About You" (Jimmy Van Heusen, Johnny Mercer) – 4:21

Personnel 
 Tal Farlow – guitar
 James Williams – piano
 Gary Mazzaroppi – bass
 Vinnie Johnson – drums
Production notes:
 Carl Jefferson – producer
 Ed Trabanco – engineer
 Marie Ostrosky – assistant engineer
 Phil Edwards – engineer
 George Horn – remastering
 Kent Judkins – art direction
 Bruce Burr – photography
 Gordon Raddue – liner notes
 Kathleen Vance – production coordination
 Robert Walston – art direction

References 

Tal Farlow albums
1983 albums
Concord Records albums